Bidu (also Romanized as Bīdū; also known as Mazra‘eh-ye Bīdū) is a village in Eram Rural District, Eram District, Dashtestan County, Bushehr Province, Iran. At the 2006 census, its population was 192, in 43 families.

References 

Populated places in Dashtestan County